Ottar Gjermundshaug (29 January 1925, Alvdal – 10 April 1963) was a Norwegian nordic combined skier who competed in the early 1950s. He won a silver medal in the individual event at the 1950 FIS Nordic World Ski Championships in Lake Placid, New York.

Gjermundshaug also finished sixth in the individual event and 18th in the 18 km cross-country skiing event at the 1952 Winter Olympics in Oslo.

He represented Alvdal IL.

Cross-country skiing results

Olympic Games

World Championships

References

External links

Ottar Gjermundshaug's profile at Sports Reference.com

1925 births
1963 deaths
People from Alvdal
Nordic combined skiers at the 1952 Winter Olympics
Cross-country skiers at the 1952 Winter Olympics
Norwegian male cross-country skiers
Olympic cross-country skiers of Norway
Norwegian male Nordic combined skiers
FIS Nordic World Ski Championships medalists in Nordic combined
Sportspeople from Innlandet
20th-century Norwegian people